Tafsīr al-Jalālayn is a classical Sunni interpretation (tafsir) of the Quran, composed first by Jalal ad-Din al-Maḥalli in 1459 and then completed after his death by Jalal ad-Din as-Suyuti in 1505, thus its name, which means "Tafsir of the two Jalals". It is recognised as one of the most popular exegeses of the Quran today, due to its simple style and its conciseness—it is only one volume in length.

Tafsir al-Jalalayn has been translated into many languages, including English (two translations), French, Bengali, Urdu, Persian, Malay/Indonesian, Turkish, and Japanese.

See also
List of Tafsir works
List of Sunni books

References

External links
 Tafsir al-Jalalayn in Arabic (in kindle store)
 Tafsir al-Jalalayn in English (in PDF)
 Al-Quran project includes Tafsir of the two Jalals (Jalal al-Din al-Mahalli and Jalal al-Din al-Suyuti) with annotated interpretation.
 Tafsir al-Jalalayn (Arabic Text)

 Quran with Tafsir Al-Jalalayn

Jalalayn
Books by al-Suyuti
16th-century Arabic books